Green thumb means a natural talent for gardening or a gardener with such a talent.

Green Thumb may refer to:

Green Thumb (novel), a 1999 young-adult novel by Rob Thomas
 Green Thumb (brand), a brand of garden products sold by True Value
 Green Thumb Theatre, a Canadian children's theatre company
 "Green Thumbs", an episode of Beavis and Butt-head

See also 

 Greenfingers (disambiguation)